Sakoamadinika is a rural municipality in Madagascar. It belongs to the district of Tsaratanana, which is a part of Betsiboka Region.

References

Populated places in Betsiboka